Cardenal is a surname of Spanish origin. People with that name include:

 Ernesto Cardenal (born 1925), Nicaraguan cleric and liberation theologian
 Fernando Cardenal (1934–2016), Nicaraguan cleric and liberation theologian
 José Cardenal (born 1943), Cuban-American former baseball player
 José Francisco Cardenal (born 1940), Nicaraguan businessman and rebel
 Juan Pablo Cardenal (born 1968), Spanish journalist and sinologist
 Katia Cardenal (born 1963), Nicaraguan singer/songwriter
 Peire Cardenal (1180–1278), Occitan troubadour
 Salvador Cardenal (1960–2010), Nicaraguan singer/songwriter
 Xavier Chamorro Cardenal (1932–2008), Nicaraguan editor of El Nuevo Diario, a Nicaraguan newspaper

See also
 Cardenal Caro (disambiguation)
 Cardenal Quintero Municipality, in the Venezuelan state of Mérida
 Cardinal (disambiguation)
 Cardinale, a surname